Tommaso da San Cipriano was a Roman Catholic prelate who served as Bishop of Venosa (1519–?).

Biography
Tommaso da San Cipriano was ordained a priest in the Order of Preachers. In 1519, he was appointed during the papacy of Pope Leo X as Bishop of Venosa. It is uncertain how long he served as Bishop of Venosa; the next bishop of record was Guido de' Medici who was appointed in 1527.

References

External links and additional sources
 (for Chronology of Bishops) 
 (for Chronology of Bishops) 

16th-century Italian Roman Catholic bishops
Bishops appointed by Pope Leo X
Dominican bishops